Dongnimmun or Independence Gate is a memorial gate at Seoul, built by Soh Jaipil in late 19th century, as a symbol of Korea's commitment to independence around the world. It is designated as Historic Sites of South Korea in 1963, and relocated to 70m northwest from original location in 1979 for preservation.

History

Background

In 1895, the Government of Joseon abandoned its long continued diplomatic policy of Sadae (flunkeyism). Under this policy, Joseon was respecting political influence of China. To celebrate it, the Government of Joseon demolished Yeongeunmun in February 1895, which was a traditional symbol of flunkeyism built in 16th century as a symbolic gate only for welcoming Chinese diplomats to Joseon. In March 1895, this movement of the Joseon Government got recognized by the Treaty of Shimonoseki following the First Sino-Japanese War. Yet it was also important to promote the Joseon's public to discard spirit of excessive reliance on China. To achieve this, Korean-American freedom fighter Soh Jaipil planned building a new gate near site of Yeongeunmun's ruins to symbolize diplomatic independence of Joseon around the world. His plan was agreed by King Gojong of Korea, and he named it Independence Arch.

Plan for construction
To support construction of the Dongnimmun, he constituted a association named as 'Independence Club', and published Korea's first modern newspaper named Tongnip Sinmun. Through broad public campaign by Tongnip Sinmun, construction of Dongnimmun could be propelled by funds of various citizens in Joseon. In English edition of Tongnip Sinmun, called as The independent, Soh Jaipil wrote reason for building Dongnimmun as following;

Construction and relocation
Soh Jaipil planned model design of Dongnimmun as Arc de Triomphe in Paris. Its specific design was delivered by unknown Swiss architect working for the German legation in Joseon. Its construction began in 1896, and finished in January 1898. The construction process was overseen by Korean engineer named ''. Dongnimmun measures 14.28 meters in height and 11.48 meters in width, and is made of approximately 1,850 pieces of granite. 

The Government of South Korea designated it as Historic Sites of South Korea in 1963. At the time of construction, it was built on north of Yeongeunmun's ruins. Yet later it was relocated to 70m northwest from its original place with Plinths of Yeongeunmun Gate, Seoul, due to construction of modern city road. It is now located in Seodaemun Independence Park, where Dongnimmun is located, is easily accessed from Exit 4 or 5 of Dongnimmun Station on Seoul Subway Line 3.

Gallery

See also
 
Yeongeunmun Gate
Plinths of Yeongeunmun Gate, Seoul
Joseon Dynasty
Korean Empire
First Sino-Japanese War
Treaty of Shimonoseki
Soh Jaipil
Independence Club
Tongnip Sinmun
Seodaemun Independence Park
Dongnimmun station

References

External links
 Dongnimmun Arch, Seoul (Cultural Heritage Administration Official site in English)

Historic Sites of South Korea
Joseon dynasty
Korean Empire
Soh Jaipil
History of Seoul
Gates in South Korea
Buildings and structures in Seodaemun District
Buildings and structures completed in 1898